Mastododera nodicollis is a species of beetle in the family Cerambycidae. It was described by Johann Christoph Friedrich Klug in 1833.

References

Dorcasominae
Beetles described in 1833